All Star Mr & Mrs is a British television show which first began airing on 12 April 2008 on ITV. It is a celebrity revival of the original Mr and Mrs that aired on ITV from 1968 to 1988 with two separate revivals in 1995–1996 and 1999 and was also based on the Canadian game show of the same name. The programme is hosted by Phillip Schofield, although Fern Britton had co-hosted the show with Schofield between 2008–10. The show features celebrities and their real-life partners playing to win up to £30,000 for their chosen charities. 
 
On 13 August 2017, it was reported that the series would be rested for a year, with ITV taking the series off their TV schedule for 2017. It was also rumoured that the programme could be axed altogether.

Format

Round 1
The first round is the personal couples round. The celebrity will answer three questions about their partner while their partner is in the soundproof booth wearing headphones and a blindfold to prevent them from seeing and hearing their partner's answers. Once all three questions are answered, their partner will join them and have to match as many answers as they can to their partners.

All three couples play this first round.

Round 2
Each couple is placed inside a sight-proof booth so that they cannot see one another. They must answer six questions using their paddles (Blue for male and Pink for female). The more answers they match, the more chance they have of going through to the final.

Again, all three couples do this. However, at the end of this round, the winning couple is announced and they go through to the final. The other couples each receive a carriage clock and receive £5,000 for their favorite charity.

Round 3
This time, the winning celebrity must enter the booth while their partner answers four questions. For every answer that they match correctly on the first three questions, they win £5,000 for their chosen charity, £15,000 if all three are matched. If they match the fourth and final question, they will double any money earned on the first three questions, up to £30,000.

Transmissions

Series

Specials

Episode guide

Series 1 (2008)

Christmas Special (2008)

Series 2 (2009)

 Episode 10 was originally due to air as the final episode of the second series on 4 July 2009. However, the death of Michael Jackson prevented the episode's broadcast, as his brother, Tito Jackson was seen laughing about him in it. The episode was pulled as it was deemed too insensitive to air the footage so soon after his death.

Christmas Special (2009)

Series 3 (2010)

Series 4 (2012)
After a two-year break, it was announced by CPL Productions that All Star Mr & Mrs would return for a new series airing on ITV during the autumn of 2012. This time, the show was presented solely by Schofield. Stephen Mulhern took over as host of the Text Santa special as Schofield played the game with his wife Steph.

Text Santa Special (2012)

Series 5 (2013)

Christmas Special (2013)

Series 6 (2014)
The sixth series was recorded in March 2014 and premiered on 11 June 2014.

Series 7 (2015)
The seventh series was recorded from 27 June to 1 July 2015 and premiered on 30 September 2015.

Christmas Special (2015)

Series 8 (2016)
An eighth series of All Star Mr & Mrs was recorded from 7 to 10 July 2016 and aired from 31 August 2016.

Christmas Special (2016)

References

External links
Official Twitter

2000s British game shows
2010s British game shows
2008 British television series debuts
2016 British television series endings
ITV game shows
Television series by Sony Pictures Television
English-language television shows